Wei-Min Hao (born 7 April 1953) is an atmospheric chemist, Taiwanese-American climatologist, and currently works in the United States Department of Agriculture. His work directly contributed to the reason for awarding the 2007 Nobel Peace Prize. He is a member of the United States Agency for International Development (USAID) and the Intergovernmental Panel on Climate Change (IPCC).

Biography 
After graduating from Taipei Municipal Jianguo High School, Hao studied chemistry at Fu Jen Catholic University (BS degree), obtained a Master's Degree from Massachusetts Institute of Technology (MIT), and a PhD in Atmospheric Chemistry from Harvard University.

In 1991, he works in the US Department of Agriculture and Forest Services in the city of Missoula.

In 1994, he became a member of the Intergovernmental Panel on Climate Change (IPCC). In the same year, the first Climate Change Report was published by the IPCC. He was responsible for Rocky Mountain Climate Monitoring.

In 2007, with the IPCC and participant in the pertinent works, they obtain the Nobel Peace Prize.

Until 2014, he has been the author or co-author of more than 70 publications in specialized magazines. His publications are widely cited by major institutions and universities around the world.

References

External links 
Wei Min M. Hao | Rocky Mountain Research Station
Wei-Min Hao's research works
Fu Jen Catholic University: 與美國前副總統高爾共同榮獲諾貝爾和平獎 傑出校友郝慰民博士回校開講
Dr. Hao talks about the 2007 Nobel Peace Prize

American meteorologists
Harvard University alumni
United States Department of Agriculture officials
Intergovernmental Panel on Climate Change
Massachusetts Institute of Technology alumni
Fu Jen Catholic University alumni
1953 births
Living people